The Table Tennis Federation of Kosovo (TTFK) (Albanian: Federata e Pingpongut tė Kosovės,  / Stonoteniski savez Kosova) is the governing body responsible for table tennis in Kosovo.

History
The TTFK was recognised by sport's governing body, in this case the International Table Tennis Federation in 2003.

In July 2022, competitors from Kosovo were prevented from participating in the European Youth Table Tennis Championships held in Belgrade, Serbia due to political reasons.

Notes

References

External links
 Official website

Kosovo
Sports governing bodies in Kosovo